Maïtena Biraben (born 2 July 1967) is a French-Swiss television presenter and producer. She has notably presented on France 5 the program Les Maternelles and on Canal+ La Matinale and Le Supplément. From September 2015 to June 2016, she presented on the same channel Le Grand Journal, succeeding to Antoine de Caunes.

Early life and education 
Maïtena Biraben was born in Épinay-sur-Seine in the department of Seine-Saint-Denis. Her father worked in photogravure and is of Basque origin. Her mother was an advertiser, before becoming a direction secretary. She left with her family in the department of Landes and entered in a boarding school held by religious sisters.

After her high school final exam, she returned to Paris to study history at the Pantheon-Sorbonne University.

Career 
During the 1990s, Biraben presented several programs on the Télévision Suisse Romande, in addition to the artistic production. Despite a great popularity in Switzerland, she left the service and moved to Paris.

In 1997, Biraben joined M6 to present a program broadcast on the first part of the evening titles Télé Casting, that was not very successful. The same year, she quickly passed on France 2 where she presents Vue sur la mer and Emmenez-moi between 1998 and 2000, and a cinema chronicle in Télématin between 1999 and 2001.

In 2001, Biraben arrives on La Cinquième (which has then become France 5) and presents the program Les Maternelles between 2001 and 2004. The program obtained the 7 d'Or for best educative program. She also presents in 2003 on the same channel the program Psychologies : un moment pour soi.

In 2004, Biraben arrives on Canal+ where she presents Nous ne sommes pas des anges from 2004 to 2006 and Les Nouveaux Explorateurs from 2007 to 2008. From September 2008 to June 2012, she presents La Matinale and since September 2012, she presents Le Supplément every Saturday and Sunday until June 2015.

In February 2013, Biraben exceptionally replaces Cyril Hanouna in Touche pas à mon poste on D8, who was presenting Nouvelle Star. During summer 2013, Biraben became a present or for the News Show. She was one of the favourites on Canal+ to replace Michel Denisot on the presentation of Le Grand Journal from 2013 to 2014, which has finally been given to Antoine de Caunes. However, she presents a few programs to replace him. She finally succeeds to him in September 2015 on presenting Le Grand Journal. But the season is tough with a lack of audience and some polemics. She stated comments that created controversy. 
In June 2016, as a prominent TV host, Biraben left Canal+.

Personal life 
Biraben has been married three times. 
Biraben lives with her partner and her two sons (born in 1996 and 2006) in the suburb of Paris, France. Biraben has the French-Swiss dual citizenship.

Publication

See also 
Le Grand Journal (Canal+)

References

External links 
Videos of programs with Maïtena Biraben on the site of the Institut national de l'audiovisuel 

1967 births
French television presenters
French television producers
Women television producers
Swiss television presenters
Swiss television producers
People from Épinay-sur-Seine
Living people
French women television presenters